Matthew King (born 1967) is a British composer, pianist and educator. His works include opera, piano and chamber music, and choral and orchestral pieces. He has been described by Judith Weir, Master of the Queen’s Music, as “one of Britain's most adventurous composers, utterly skilled, imaginative and resourceful."

Operas
King has composed a number of operas and music theatre pieces which have earned him international recognition. Several of these pieces have a community component, combining amateurs and young people with professionals in the tradition of Benjamin Britten's Noye's Fludde. King's first chamber opera, The Snow Queen, was composed for the British soprano Jane Manning and her virtuoso ensemble Jane's Minstrels. The Snow Queen was described by one reviewer as "music of distinctive beauty with disarming theatre sense." The opera Jonah (libretto by Michael Irwin (author)) was commissioned by the Canterbury Festival and first produced in Canterbury Cathedral in 1996; the dramatic cantata Gethsemane was premiered by Florilegium at the Spitalfields Festival in 1998; the Brunel (opera project), featured on BBC Radio 4's Setting Brunel to Music in October 2003; the community opera On London Fields (libretto by Alasdair Middleton), winner of a Royal Philharmonic Society Award in 2005, was described by Stephen Pettitt in the Evening Standard as "unafraid of complexity, even when writing for very young performers. Some of the clashing rhythms and textural layerings are mind-boggling."; the dramatic cantata Hear our Voice (co-written with the British composer Jonathan Dove) was premiered in London, Nuremberg and Prague in 2006; the chamber opera Das Babylon Experiment (German libretto by Michael Kerstan) was produced in Nuremberg in 2008.

King's experimental dramatic cantata Schoenberg in Hollywood (libretto by Alasdair Middleton), premiered in Guildhall School of Music and Drama's Milton Court concert hall in 2015. His comic faux-Baroque cantata Il Pastorale, l'Urbano e il Suburbano (libretto by Alasdair Middleton) was first performed at Snape Maltings, Aldeburgh in 2015. King's chamber opera The Pied Piper (libretto by Michael Irwin (author)) was first produced at Stour Music Festival in 2015, with the British countertenor Michael Chance in the title role. The Pied Piper was subsequently revived in a new revision with German translation (Was Bleibt) in productions in Salzburg and Nuremberg in 2018.

Instrumental works
King composed a range of instrumental works. His Robert Schumann in Three Pieces was recorded by the Avenue A ensemble and was described, by one critic, as "rich and sumptuous, with some spine-tingling moments." King has composed two string quartets (Quartet 2001 and Four Places in Yorkshire), both premiered by the Fitzwilliam String Quartet. His orchestral work Totentango was first performed in 2010 by the London Symphony Orchestra. His 'Hitchcockian tone poem’ called Velocity, for ensemble, chorus and big band, was premiered by the Aurora Orchestra in 2011. Blue, a rhapsody for piano and chamber orchestra, was written in 2011 for the Savant pianist Derek Paravicini, with whom Matthew King had previously improvised on BBC Radio 4 in 2009. In 2018 King composed a new three-movement piano concerto for Derek Paravicini, which premiered at the Mainly Mozart Festival in San Diego, conducted by Michael Francis (conductor)

King has experimented with unusual combinations of instruments and unconventional performing environments. The King's Wood Symphony (2007), for multiple horns, percussion, and an electronic score by Nye Parry, was composed for performance in a forest (originally King's Wood in Kent). Described as "a site-specific symphony, one that could never sound the same way twice," the work utilizes the harmonic spectra of natural horns and electronically altered horn sounds calling to each other across a vast performing space. King's Wood Symphony also gave rise to two chamber works, a trio for violin, horn and piano, and a nonet of horns with electronics, both premiered in the Wigmore Hall in 2007. An ambitious community project in 2008 produced the Odyssean Variations, premiered by the British cellist Natalie Clein and an orchestra of young musicians from the London Borough of Hackney, at LSO St Luke's in London. Una Piccolo Sinfonia (2011) is a miniature symphony in three movements for an ensemble of nine piccolos.

King embarked on a series of increasingly political protest pieces, including Fix This (2012) for piano, violin, cello, electric guitar and two percussionists, first performed at the Royal Northern College of Music. Fix This references theme tunes and catchphrases associated with Jimmy Savile.

Piano works
King's piano miniature Sonatas (2005) takes only a minute to perform and contains a succession of 32 bars and quotes all of Beethoven’s piano sonatas in chronological order. King composed sequences of nocturnes, polonaise (dance)s and Contemplations (after Erik Satie). He composed a cycle of single movement piano sonatas, in the tradition of Scarlatti, but inspired by a wide range of musicians and topics including Hildegard of Bingen, Duke Ellington, Bernard Herrman, Italian Opera, Irish Folk Music, Morton Feldman, Derek Jarman and Bill Evans, among others.

Educator
An alumnus of the University of York, King is also an educator. From 1998 to 2001, he was head of composition at the Yehudi Menuhin School and is professor of composition at Guildhall School of Music & Drama. For over a decade, he has led workshops for Hackney Music Development Trust. He has led workshops for Bridging Arts in Salzburg and guest-leads the Wigmore Study Group at the Wigmore Hall in London. He has presented a number of programs on BBC Radio 4 and Radio 3.

Selected works
The Snow Queen (Chamber Opera) 1992
Jonah (opera/oratorio) 1996
Gethsemane (chamber oratorio) 1998
Ash on the Ground (Symphonic Variations for Avenue A) 1998
Love in a Life (soprano and ensemble) 2000
Night Phantoms and Rocking Horses (ensemble) 2000
Quartet 2001 (String Quartet) 2001
Four Places in Yorkshire (String Quartet) 2004
On London Fields (Community Opera) 2004 (winner of 2005 RPS Education Award)
Brunel (opera project) 2004
Sonatas (Piano solo) 2005
The Darker side of Mechanical Perfection (orchestra) 2005
Hear our Voice (community cantata) 2006 (written in collaboration with Jonathan Dove)
King's Wood Symphony (horns, percussion and electronics) 2007 (written in collaboration with Nye Parry and commissioned by Stour Valley Arts and Wigmore Hall
Odyssean Variations (cello and orchestra) 2008
Das Babylon Experiment (chamber opera) 2008
Totentango (commissioned by the London Symphony Orchestra) 2009
Blue (piano and orchestra) 2011
Velocity (ensemble, big band, cellos and chorus) 2011
Una Piccolo Sinfonia (for 9 piccolos) 2001
A Glass Slipper (ballet) 2012
Out of the Depths (chorus and orchestra) 2012
Cure of Souls (string quartet, piano and electronics) 2012
Fix This (violin, cello, electric guitar, piano and percussion) 2012
Schoenberg in Hollywood (SSAATTBB, flute, clarinet, trumpet, trombone, violin, viola, cello, piano, percussion) 2015 (commissioned by Guildhall Vocal Dept. with words by Alasdair Middleton)
Ringing Changes (SATB, harp, piano and electronics) 2015 (commissioned by the University of Kent for its 50th anniversary, with words by poet Patricia Debney)
The Pied Piper (Chamber Opera) 2015 (commissioned by Stour Music) with libretto by Michael Irwin (author))
Il Pastorale, l'Urbano e il Suburbano (soprano, tenor and chorus, flute, violin, cello, harpsichord, theorbo, saxophone and electronics) 2015 (commissioned by the Brook Street Band, with words by Alasdair Middleton)
Rumi Songs (mezzo-soprano and piano) 2015
Piano Sonatas (Volume 1) 2018
Piano Concerto (Piano and chamber orchestra) 2018 commissioned by the Mainly Mozart Festival, San Diego

References

Sources
Maycock, Robert, King's Wood Symphony, Challock, Kent, Review of King's Wood Symphony, The Independent, 26 June 2007 (retrieved 29 April 2010)
Morley, Christopher Culture: Riches at the stroke of a baton, The Birmingham Post, 31 December 2003. (retrieved via subscription 3 March 2008)
Odam, George and Bannan, Nicholas (eds.), The Reflective Conservatoire: Studies in Music Education, Ashgate Publishing, Ltd, 2005 pp 151–178
Pettitt, Stephen, "Hats off to the young and old of Hackney", Evening Standard, 22 November 2004 (retrieved 29 April 2010)
White, Michael, Review of the first full staging of The Snow Queen, The Independent, 1 January 1996 (retrieved via subscription 3 March 2008)
White, Michael, "At last: a really festive festival" (Review of King's Gethsemane at the Spitalfields Festival), The Independent, 7 June 1998 (retrieved 29 April 2010)
Rees, Carla,  (Music Web International review Of King's Robert Schumann in Three Pieces), April 2009

External links
Guildhall School of Music and Drama http://www.gsmd.ac.uk/music/staff/teaching_staff/department/8-department-of-composition/392-matthew-king/]
BBC Radio 4 Documentary: Matthew King on Joseph Haydn in London
BBC Radio 4 Documentary: Matthew King on the musical savant Derek Paravicini
Matthew King on Sound Cloud

1967 births
Living people
20th-century classical composers
English classical composers
Place of birth missing (living people)
English opera composers
Male opera composers
English male classical composers
20th-century English composers
20th-century British male musicians